Bennett Keith Schaeufele (March 6, 1937 – July 26, 2010), better known by his stage name Ben Keith, was an American musician and record producer.  Known primarily for his work as a pedal steel guitarist with Neil Young, Keith was a fixture of the Nashville country music community in the 1950s and 1960s before working with numerous successful rock, country and pop artists as both a producer and versatile, multi-instrumentalist sideman for over four decades. Neil Young affectionately referred to him as "Long Grain" (a joking word play reference to a variety of Uncle Ben's Rice and to Ben's height). Keith was inducted into the Musicians Hall of Fame and Museum in 2014.

Biography
Born in Fort Riley, Kansas, Keith later relocated to Bowling Green, Kentucky before working as a session musician in Nashville. Keith's first big recording in Nashville was playing on Patsy Cline's 1961 hit "I Fall to Pieces".

Keith first worked with Neil Young in 1971 on Young's Harvest album. They were introduced by Elliot Mazer, the album's producer, who was looking for a session player in Nashville on short notice. They collaborated for nearly 40 years, during which time Keith played with Young on over a dozen albums and on numerous tours. Young co-produced Keith's 1994 album Seven Gates, while Keith played the role of Grandpa Green in Young's movie Greendale, a film accompaniment to Young's 2003 album of the same name.

In addition to his work with Young, Keith worked with Terry Reid, Todd Rundgren, Lonnie Mack, The Band, Blue, David Crosby, Graham Nash, Paul Butterfield, J. J. Cale, Linda Ronstadt, Warren Zevon, Ian and Sylvia, Emmylou Harris, Willie Nelson, Waylon Jennings, Tompall Glaser, Anne Murray and Ringo Starr. He served as the producer of Jewel's debut album Pieces of You, and also worked as a solo artist. He toured with Crosby, Stills, Nash & Young on their 2006 Freedom of Speech Tour.

Keith died of a heart attack on July 26, 2010 while staying at Young's Broken Arrow Ranch in Northern California.

Discography
To a Wild Rose (En Point, 1984)
Seven Gates: A Christmas Album by Ben Keith and Friends (1994)

References

External links
In Memory of Ben Keith: 1937 – 2010
Music Web Express 3000 interview with Ben Keith

1937 births
2010 deaths
American rock guitarists
American male guitarists
Record producers from Kansas
Record producers from Tennessee
Pedal steel guitarists
People from Fort Riley, Kansas
People from Nashville, Tennessee
Musicians from Bowling Green, Kentucky
Crazy Horse (band) members
American session musicians
Country musicians from Kentucky
Singers from Kentucky
Songwriters from Kentucky
Rock musicians from Kentucky
Guitarists from Kentucky
Great Speckled Bird (band) members
20th-century American guitarists
The Stray Gators members